Kanne is a surname. Notable people with the surname include:

Friedrich August Kanne (1778–1833), composer and music critic in Vienna
Michael Stephen Kanne (1938-2022), American federal judge
William R. Kanne (fl. 1940s), American physicist

German words and phrases